MV Agamemnon was a cargo liner launched in 1929 for the Blue Funnel Line between United Kingdom ports and the Far East. She was requisitioned by the Royal Navy for conversion to the auxiliary minelayer HMS Agamemnon. She joined the 1st Minelaying Squadron based at Kyle of Lochalsh (port ZA) laying mines for the World War II Northern Barrage. When minelaying was completed in October 1943, she was retained for conversion to an amenities ship as part of a mobile naval base for British Pacific Fleet warships. She underwent further conversion at Vancouver in 1944 including installation of a movie theater and canteen to be staffed by mercantile crews of the Royal Fleet Auxiliary service. Conversion was incomplete when hostilities with Japan ended, and she was returned to Blue Funnel Line in 1946.

Notes

References
 
 

Minelayers of the Royal Navy
1929 ships
World War II minelayers of the United Kingdom
Ships built in Belfast